Pant  may refer to:

Clothing
 Pants or trousers, an article of outer clothing worn on the lower half of the body
 Underpants, an item of underwear

Places
Pant, Denbighshire, Wales; a township of Llysfaen
Pant, Merthyr Tydfil, Wales
Pant, Shropshire, England
Pant, Wrexham, Wales; an electoral ward in Wrexham County Borough
River Pant, upper part of the River Blackwater, Essex, England

Other uses
 Pant (surname), a North Indian and Nepalese surname
 Annette Island Airport (ICAO: PANT)

See also
 Pant railway station (disambiguation)
 Panting (disambiguation)